Rájec-Jestřebí is a town in Blansko District in the South Moravian Region of the Czech Republic. It has about 3,700 inhabitants.

Administrative parts
Rájec-Jestřebí is made up of town parts of Rájec and Jestřebí and villages of Holešín and Karolín.

Geography
It lies in the Drahany Highlands. The town is situated at the confluence of the Svitava and Býkovka rivers.

History

The first written mention of Rájec is from 1141 in a deed issued by the Olomouc bishop Jindřich Zdík. There were two 13th century castles that were probably destroyed in the struggles between Margrave Jobst of Moravia and his brother Prokop. It the 14th century, they were referred to as ruins. The first written mention of Jestřebí is from 1371, when it was owned by the Lords of Bořitov.

In 1570, one of the castle ruins was completely rebuilt by Bernard Drnovský to a Renaissance residence. After the male followers of the Drnovský family became extinct in 1618, it was owned by Johanna Drnovská, who married Styrian count Georg Ehrenreich of Roggendorf. After her death in 1667, Rájec was acquired by the Roggendorf family.

In 1757, Rájec Castle was completely destroyed by fire. In 1763, Antonín Karel of Salm-Reifferscheid bought Rájec and had the Neoclassical castle built in 1763–1769. The English park was founded in 1767 and extended to its current form is 1830. After World War II, the Salm-Reifferscheid family was disseized and expelled. In 1960, the municipalities of Rájec and Jestřebí merged.

In 1973, Rájec-Jestřebí obtained the town status.

Demographics

Transport
Rájec-Jestřebí lies on the railway line from Letovice to Brno.

Sights

The Rájec nad Svitavou Castle is the main sight. Today it is owned by the state and open to the public. It contains various collections and one of the largest castle libraries with over 60,000 volumes.

The Church of All Saints in Rájec was first mentioned in 1350. The tower was added in 1574. During the rule of the Roggendorfs, the Gothic structure was rebuilt in the Baroque style.

Notable people
Milan Horálek (1931–2012), economist and politician

References

External links

Rájec Castle

Cities and towns in the Czech Republic
Populated places in Blansko District